"Tattoo" is a bugle call played in the evening in the British Army and the United States Army.

The original concept of this call was played on the snare drum and was known as "tap-too", with the same rule applying. Later on, the name was applied to more elaborate military performances, known as military tattoos. The etymology of the military tattoo is from Dutch "tap toe", unrelated to the Tahitian origin of an ink tattoo.

United States Army
In the United States Army, the tattoo signals that all light in squad rooms be extinguished and that all loud talking and other disturbances be discontinued within 15 minutes, at which time "Taps" should follow. At 28 bars long "Tattoo" is recognized as the longest bugle call in the repertoire of the United States Army.

British Army
The tattoo in the British Army is used to recall soldiers to their barracks. The call lasts twenty minutes, begins with "First Post", and ends with "Last Post".

See also
 Military tattoo

References

Bugle calls